Scaphyglottis reflexa is a species of orchid occurring from Grenada to Central America and tropical South America.

References

External links 

reflexa
Flora of Grenada